The Ernest Haycox Estate, located in southwest Portland, Oregon, is listed on the National Register of Historic Places. The Georgian-Colonial Revival Style house was designed by Glenn Stanton for author Ernest Haycox and completed in 1940.

See also
 National Register of Historic Places listings in Southwest Portland, Oregon

References

Houses on the National Register of Historic Places in Portland, Oregon
Colonial Revival architecture in Oregon
Houses completed in 1940
1940 establishments in Oregon
Georgian Revival architecture in Oregon
Southwest Portland, Oregon
Portland Historic Landmarks